Allegro is a software library for video game development. The functionality of the library includes support for basic 2D graphics, image manipulation, text output, audio output, MIDI music, input and timers, as well as additional routines for fixed-point and floating-point matrix arithmetic, Unicode strings, file system access, file manipulation, data files, and 3D graphics. The library is written in the C programming language and designed to be used with C, C++, or Objective-C, with bindings available for Python, Lua, Scheme, D, Go, and other languages. Allegro comes with extensive documentation and many examples.

Allegro supports Windows, macOS, Unix-like systems, Android, and iOS, abstracting their application programming interfaces (APIs) into one portable interface. It can run also on top of Simple DirectMedia Layer which is used to run Allegro programs in web browser using Emscripten.

Released under the terms of the zlib license, Allegro is free and open source software.

History 

However, Hargreaves abandoned the Atari version as he realized the platform was dying, and reimplemented his work for the Borland C++ and DJGPP compilers in 1995. Support for Borland C++ was dropped in version 2.0, and DJGPP was the only supported compiler. As DJGPP was a DOS compiler, all games which used Allegro therefore used DOS. Around 1998, Allegro branched out into several versions. A port to Windows, WinAllegro, was created, and also during this time, a Unix port of Allegro, XwinAllegro, was created. These various ports were brought together during the Allegro 3.9 WIP versions, with Allegro 4.0 being the first stable version of Allegro to support multiple platforms.

Allegro 5 

Current development is focused on the Allegro 5 branch, a complete redesign of both the API and much of the library's internal operation. Effort was made to make the API more consistent and multi-thread safe. By default, the library is now hardware accelerated using OpenGL or DirectX rendering backends where appropriate. Many of the addons that existed as separate projects for Allegro 4 now interface seamlessly with Allegro proper and are bundled with the default installation. Allegro 5 is event driven.

Features 

Allegro 5 supports following features in its Core API:

 Configuration files – INI format file handling
 Displays - working with windows
 Events - event management
 File I/O - abstraction over both real files and files inside some data file (e.g. ZIP * archive)
 Filesystem - abstraction over both real file system and file system inside some data file (e.g. ZIP archive)
 Fixed point math - might useful for embedded processors without FPU
 Fullscreen modes
 Graphics routines - colors, pixel formats, bitmaps, clipping
 Haptic routines - force feedback and vibration on input devices
 Joystick routines
 Keyboard routines
 Memory management
 Monitors
 Mouse routines
 Path structures - file path manipulation
 Shader
 State - you can store and later restore the state of Allegro application
 System routines
 Threads
 Time
 Timer
 Touch input
 Transformations – transformation of coordinates for 2D and 3D
 UTF-8 string routines
 Direct3D integration
 OpenGL integration

Addons 

The community of Allegro users have contributed several library extensions to handle things like scrolling tile maps and import and export of various file formats. Also some parts of what used to be part of Allegro, is now separated as an addon in Allegro 5. These addons are distributed with the core library:

 Audio addon
 Audio codecs - .wav, .flac, .ogg, .opus, .it, .mod, .s3m, .xm, .voc
 Color addon - color space conversion
 Font addons
 Image I/O addon - BMP, DDS, PCX, TGA, JPEG, PNG
 Main addon
 Memfile addon - treat a fixed block of contiguous memory as a file
 Native dialogs addon
 PhysicsFS addon - using archive as a file system
 Primitives addon - drawing primitives (e.g. circle)
 Video streaming addon

See also 

 Borland Graphics Interface (BGI)
 ClanLib
 DirectX
 List of game engines
 Microsoft XNA
 OpenAL
 OpenGL
 OpenML
 Raylib
 SciTech SNAP
 SDL
 SFML
 UniVBE

References

External links 
 
 Allegro Wiki
 Games Using Allegro 
 Shawn Hargreaves's Homepage

AmigaOS 4 software
Application programming interfaces
C (programming language) libraries
Cross-platform software
Free game engines
Free software programmed in C
Graphics libraries
Linux APIs
MacOS APIs
MorphOS software
Software using the zlib license
Video game development software
Widget toolkits
Windows APIs